Joe Saldana (born November 14, 1944) is an American former open-wheel racing driver.

Racing career

He moved to Lincoln, Nebraska at an early age where he grew up and started his auto racing career. Joe's uncle, Orville Hoffman, along with Buck Fallstead, had modified stock cars and Joe was bit by the racing bug before he was old enough to drive. In 1961 he bought his first car for $500 and he made his debut at Capital Beach Speedway in Lincoln.

By 1964 "Lil' Joe" was winning features in his own creations and by 1967 he was ready to dominate. During the winter Joe and master car builder Don Brown constructed the Mechanical Rabbit roadsterstyle sprint car. After a few weeks early in the season sorting out the new car, which was one of three built and raced by Brown, Saldana and Greg Weld, Joe and his Rabbit went on a tear. He won many features, while finishing second in the Knoxville points to Bill Utz. He set a one-lap record at Knoxville, Iowa, during qualifying at the Knoxville Nationals with a 21.45 second lap. With the lap record in hand, Joe set out to put a Nationals win in his pocket as well. Everything was going according to plan, with Joe leading easily, until a wheel came off with six laps left. He was able to scramble back to a 7th-place finish after replacing the errant rubber.

Saldana got off to a rocky start in 1968, as he crashed his sleek roadster during the second night of racing at Knoxville on May 4. Joe injured his wrist in the accident and his Mechanical Rabbit suffered severe front end damage. By mid-June however "Little Joe" had the car back to full song, winning again on a regular basis. His early season crash no doubt cost him the Knoxville point championship, as he narrowly lost to Dick Sutcliffe. In the 1968 Knoxville Nationals, he finished 4th behind Ray Lee Goodwin, Jerry Blundy and Earl Wagner.

The year 1969 brought wins at Eagle and Knoxville and a Big Car Racing Association (BCRA) sprint win at Belleville, Kansas. At the Knoxville Nationals, Joe held on for a 6th-place finish with Kenny Gritz winning the race. He was able to take the Knoxville season point battle down to the last night, but for the third year in a row, had to settle for second behind Bob Williams.

For 1970, Joe drove the upright Roger Beck house car, which was owned by John Leverenz and Bill Chadborne. "Little Joe" swept to wins just about everywhere he raced. By the time August rolled around, he was the odds-on favorite to finally get that Knoxville Nationals win he had been seeking for so long. He proceeded to run away with the National Championship race defeating Dick Sutcliffe, Ray Lee Goodwin, and Jan Opperman. He also easily won the Knoxville season point title. In the fall of 1970, Joe ventured out to California, where he drove the 1969 California Racing Association (CAA) championship winning Ernie Duncan Chevy, and won the Ascot Grand Prix.

As strong a year as 1970 was, Joe had his sights set on a much loftier goal -the Indianapolis 500. In order to get there, Joe knew he had to go USAC racing. So in 1971, he went back east to pursue his dream of racing in the Indy 500. He had sprint car rides that year with "Boston Louie" Seymour, Steve Stapp, Robert Ziegler and E.T. Morse.

The year 1972 saw Joe's first USAC feature win, but oddly enough, it did not come in a sprint car, it was in George Gamester's USAC midget at Champaign, Illinois.

The year 1973 was the year Joe broke in the win column with the USAC sprints for the first time, and what a first time win it was aboard the Lloyd Weaver Excavating Special! The Tony Hulman Classic was the only dirt track event to be nationally televised at the time, and "Little Joe" showed ABC's Wide World of Sports viewers (and even color commentator and former World Champion, Jackie Stewart) just what a sprinter can do in the hands of a master driver, as Saldana never set a wheel wrong the entire 40 laps at the Terre Haute Action Track, easily defeating Rollie Beale, Don Nordhorn, Bruce Walkup and Sammy Sessions.

Saldana moved to the Smith Speed Shop Special of Ray & Cissi Smith for 1974. Although he was close on several occasions, Joe did not manage any wins with the Smith Chevy as the car proved less reliable than desired.

If 1974 had made Joe's Indy 500 dream seem further away than ever, 1975 brought it right back into focus. Piloting the powerful Mauri Amerling Chevy, Saldana took back to back wins at the Indy Fairgrounds mile and Terre Haute. The Terre Haute being especially dramatic, with nine lead changes, and Joe finally taking to the cushion for the victory. Then, in mid-July, just as he was looking like a serious title contender, Joe dumped his ride hard at Eldora. Joe wasn't hurt in the mishap, but the Amerling car was out of commission for the rest of the year. Saldana was able to land a ride in one of Don Siebert's sprinters, and even score his first pavement win in the car at St. Paul, Minn., but faded to seventh in the final USAC points. Joe also started making some Indy car connections in 1975, crewing for A.J. Watson at Indy, that year.

September 1976 saw Saldana record the biggest win of his career in the Hoosier Hundred dirt champ car race. Joe ran solidly in the top ten until the 51st lap, when a crash involving several front running cars, caused a red flag. Severe injuries to family friend Jan Opperman overshadowed a great dual between Saldana and A.J. Foyt once the race resumed. Saldana had the lead on the restart with Foyt taking the lead on the high side on lap 63. Joe fought back however, and when Foyt bobbled and caught the first turn fence four laps later, Saldana took his Ron Killman-Lloyd Weaver dirt champ car to the lead for good. Foyt held on for second, followed by Sheldon Kinser, Cassella, and Jim Hurtubise. On the strength of his Hoosier run, Joe was fifth in the 1976 USAC Dirt Champ standings, right behind Cassella, Parsons, Kinser, and Larry Rice.

Saldana broke into the Indianapolis Motor Speedway in 1977. Driving the Ralph Wilke Leader Cards Eagle-Offy wrenched by A.J.Watson, Joe breezed through his rookie test and qualified at 184.596 mph, only to be bumped from that race.

Finally in 1978, the dream became reality, with Joe qualifying Gus & Dick Hoffman's Mr. WizeBuys Carpet Eagle-Offy solidly in the field at 190.809 mph. Saldana ran steadily all day and came home 15th, collecting $20,690 for his efforts. Although they didn't run the entire Championship Trail, the Saldana-Hoffman combo made most of the events, with top tens at Michigan (9th), Atlanta (10th), College Station, Texas (10th), and Michigan again (10th). Also in 1978, USAC scheduled two road course races on consecutive weekends in Great Britain. Saldana and the Hoffman Racing Team were invited to both of these. At the first race in Silverstone, England, Joe dropped out
with a burned valve. One week later, at Brands Hatch, however, "Little Joe" brought the Hoffman car home 10th.

In 1979 Championship Auto Racing Teams (CART) had split away from USAC, with each group running their own series. The KBHL/Nebraska/Hoffman team decided to race with CART, which was the tougher of the two circuits. Joe Saldana was again to be their driver, and he came up with some great efforts in making all the races. Joe again made the Indy 500 with a 188.788 mph run, and checkered 16th on race day. It was mid-summer when the team hit its stride, running 10th and 8th in a Michigan double-header, 8th at Trenton, N.J., and 6th at Atlanta. Joe finished sixteenth in the CART Championship standings. Joe also won a USAC midget event at the Eldora Speedway that year.

The bubble burst, in 1980, as Saldana and the Hoffman team could not muster the speed for a third straight Indy 500 appearance, and they missed the big show. Running selected races due to a limited budget, Joe's best, and only, Indy car finish in 1980 was a 12th at Milwaukee in August.

Although the Indy car deal was a disappointment, it was good news for dirt track fans, as it meant a stepped up program in that department for "Little Joe". He claimed one win, at Terre Haute, and five other top five finishes, while steering the Snell Brothers car to ninth in the season standings. Joe ran all the 1980 USAC Dirt Champ shows wheeling the Johnson Sheet Metal Chevy, he finished ninth for the season.

The year 1981 again found Joe out of the Indy after banging the wall in Hoffman's car. He followed that by practicing one of the Leader Cards machines, but never made a qualifying attempt.

By now, Joe's sprint car tail-tank-building business (Plastic Racing Tanks) was limiting his racing somewhat, and he only made a few USAC sprint shows. Driving the Tipp Machine & Tool Special, he did win on the Indy Fairgrounds mile.

Joe did make all the USAC dirt champ races in the Johnson Sheet Metal Special with a 5th place at Springfield, Illinois as his best effort. He ended up in eighth for the year.

The year 1982 was to be Joe's final attempt at the Indy 500. After Tom Bigelow stepped out of Dick Hammond's Genesee Beer Wagon, Joe tried to get the car up to speed, but missed the show once more. Following Indy, they tried to qualify for both the Milwaukee and Cleveland CART races but missed both. Saldana crashed heavily on 
Cleveland's Burke Airport road course, escaping injuries.

Driving the Snell Bros. Tipp Machine & Tool car on the Silver Crown (Dirt Champ) Trail in 1982, Joe had a fine year. Although unable to nail down any wins, he did finish 2nd at Springfield behind Bobby Olivero and had two other top five finishes en route to sixth in the final standings.

In 1983, Joe won at Eldora again driving in Bert Emick's All Star Circuit of Champions (ASCoC).

In February 1984, Joe ventured to Florida for the East Bay Nationals, and won the feature on the third night of the All Star action. In another rare 1984 sprint car appearance, Joe jumped into Johnny Vance's Aristocrat Special and 
showed the kids the fast way around the mile at Indy, beating Larry Rice and Johnny Parsons. Saldana also won the Silver Crown 100-lap race at Du Quion, Illinois, on Labor Day driving Mauri Amerling's car after Ron Shuman blew his tire on the last lap.

1985 was Joe's 25th and final season on the speedways, but he did not just coast through his last summer of driving. Finishing 10th at Tampa, and 8th at the Indy Fairgrounds in his first two Silver Crown starts. A sixth-place finish at Indianapolis Raceway Park prior to a promising night at the Oklahoma City State Fairgrounds while leading the first 24 laps ended with engine woes. Joe then ran 4th at the West Virginia Motor Speedway Silver Crown race after starting 20th. At Springfield, Joe set a new one-lap track record of 31 .144 and then finished 2nd when he was barely beaten to the flag in the 100 lapper by Chuck Gurney. Joe lined up 3rd for the Ted Horn 100 at Du Quion, IL, but finished 20th. Joe had another fast time at the Hoosier Hundred, but tire and motor problems relegated him to 9th at the end. In Joe's last run before hanging up the goggles, he qualified 4th and finished 9th at the 4-Crown Nationals at Eldora Speedway, near Rossburg, Ohio, in October 1985. Joe finished a close fourth in the Silver Crown Championship in 1985 driving the Mauri Amerling #4. Joe finished his USAC career with 8 sprint car, 2 Silver Crown, and 2 Midget wins.

About retirement, Joe had this to say, "I just decided that if I could be lucky enough to complete my twenty-fifth year, I'd be satisfied." He says in retrospect, "I've been extremely fortunate during the past twenty-five years and the fact that there was no family pressure to make the decision, made it much easier."

In looking back on the past 25 years, Joe easily points to the 1978 Indy 500 as the highlight of his racing career. "That first lap at Indy was something, with all those thousands of faces in the stands, but you know the next lap wasn't so bad and from then on it was just 'go racing' and it’s been that way ever since. I've been pretty lucky during my career and look back to highlights like the 1970 Knoxville Nationals, the 1973 Tony Hulman Classic and the 1976 Hoosier Hundred with a sense of accomplishment."

Personal life
Joe Saldana is married to Susie, who went to the same high school as he did in Lincoln, and they have three children: Laurie, Amy, and current World of Outlaws sprint car driver Joey Saldana.

Joe and Susie continue to live in Brownsburg, Indiana, where he has successfully built a racing oriented industrial development complex.

Knoxville Nationals results

1981 Qualified for the Main by winning the B-Main, but engine trouble prevented him from starting the race

Awards
 Nebraska Auto Racing Hall of Fame in 1998
 National Sprint Car Hall of Fame in 2000 
 Hoosier Auto Racing Fans Hall of Fame in 2016.

Indianapolis 500 results

Notes

External links

Driver Database Profile

1944 births
Champ Car drivers
Living people
Indianapolis 500 drivers
National Sprint Car Hall of Fame inductees
Sportspeople from Lincoln, Nebraska
Racing drivers from Nebraska
USAC Silver Crown Series drivers